Neobisium carcinoides is a species of pseudoscorpions in the Neobisiidae family. It is found throughout Europe with the exception of Greece, Belarus, and Russia. The type locality is 7 km south of Strasbourg, in the Bas-Rhin department, Alsace, France.

Description
They are primarily dark brown with four pairs of legs, and dark red claws.

References
 Hermann, J. 1804. La Carcinoïde (Carcinoïdes). (Chelifer. Corpore cylindrico-ovato fusco-castaneo, subtus albido; brachiorum ruforum articulo inferiore flexuoso-tereti, intermedio clavato. Nobis.) Page 118, plate 5, fig. 6, in: Hermann, J.-F. 1804. Mémoire Aptérologique. 144 pp. F.G. Levrault, Strasbourg.

Neobisiidae
Animals described in 1804
Arachnids of Europe